Serge Ivan Chermayeff (born Sergei Ivanovich Issakovich; ; 8 October 1900 – 8 May 1996) was a Russian-born British architect, industrial designer, writer, and co-founder of several architectural societies, including the American Society of Planners and Architects.

Early life
He was born into a wealthy Jewish family in Grozny, Russian Empire (today in the Chechen Republic in the Russian Federation), but moved to England at an early age where he received his education at Peterborough Lodge Preparatory School (1910-1913), the Royal Drawing Society School (1910–1913) and Harrow School (1914–1917).

Continuing education and early career
From 1922 to 1925, he received training at various schools in Germany, Austria, France and the Netherlands. During this period, he supported himself as a journalist for the Amalgamated Press (1918–23) before becoming chief designer (1924–27) at E. Williams, a decorating firm.

In 1928, he became a British citizen. That year, he and the French designer Paul Follot were placed in charge of the decorative arts department of Waring & Gillow.

Early career as an architect
After practicing architecture for three years, he and the German architect Erich Mendelsohn briefly partnered in 1933 to form their own architectural firm. They created important works in the British modernist movement, notably the De La Warr Pavilion in Bexhill, East Sussex, Cohen House, London, and Shrubs Wood (formerly Nimmo House) in Chalfont St Giles, Buckinghamshire. He was also responsible for Shann House in Rugby, Warwickshire, and Gilbey House, an office and factory complex in Camden for gin distillers Gilbey's. These are all now Listed Buildings, being designated Grade I (De La Warr), Grade II* (Cohen House, Shann House, and Shrubs Wood) and Grade II (Gilbey House) respectively. Both Mendelsohn and Chermayeff were members of the MARS Group. He also designed Bentley Wood, a Modernist house in a rural location in the Low Weald in Sussex, completed in 1938.

During the 1930s, Chermayeff designed bakelite radio cabinets for the Southend-on-Sea based company EKCO.

Architect in the U.S.
In 1940, Chermayeff emigrated to the United States where he joined Clarence W. W. Mayhew as associate architect, helping Mayhew design his own residence. Chermayeff taught in 1940 and 1941 at the California School of Fine Arts before moving to Brooklyn College, where he served as chair of the department of design until 1946. From 1941 until his death, he maintained his principal residence on Cape Cod at Wellfleet, Massachusetts. In 1946, he was recommended by Walter Gropius to become the president of the Institute of Design in Chicago; there, he was a close friend and mentor to Robert Brownjohn. Beginning in 1949, he oversaw the Institute's merger with the Illinois Institute of Technology before ultimately stepping down in 1951. After teaching at the Massachusetts Institute of Technology for a year, he served as a professor and chair of the architecture department at the  Harvard University Graduate School of Design (1953-1962) and the Yale University School of Architecture (1962-1971). Following his retirement, he briefly taught at Harvard again in 1974.

Books and awards
He wrote several books, including Community and Privacy with Christopher Alexander in 1964 and The Shape of Community with Alexander Tzonis in 1971. He died in 1996 in Wellfleet. Chermayeff's architectural drawings, project records, photographs, correspondence, teaching and writing papers, and research files are held by the Dept. of Drawings & Archives at Avery Architectural and Fine Arts Library at Columbia University.

In 1980 he was awarded the Sir Misha Black award and was added to the College of Medallists.

Descendants
His son Ivan Chermayeff was a prominent graphic designer and a founding partner of New York-based design studio Chermayeff & Geismar.

Another son Peter Chermayeff is a prominent architect best known for his design of aquariums, with colleagues, while a founding partner at Cambridge Seven Associates, from 1962 to 1998, at Chermayeff, Sollogub and Poole, 1998–2005, at Chermayeff & Poole, 2005–2009 and currently at Peter Chermayeff LLC.

His grandson Sam Chermayeff is an architect and furniture designer in Berlin.

See also
Cape Cod Modern House Trust

References

Further reading

Chan, Carson (2017). The Chermayeff Century. 032c. Retrieved 29 April 2021.

External links
Chicago Architects Oral History Project, The Art Institute of Chicago. Serge Chermayeff oral history
Serge Chermayeff architectural records and papers, 1909–1980.Held by the Department of Drawings & Archives, Avery Architectural & Fine Arts Library, Columbia University, New York City.
Master builders: Serge Chermayeff (1900–1996)
Serge Chermayeff Papers. Manuscripts and Archives, Yale University Library.

1900 births
1996 deaths
Emigrants from the Russian Empire to the United Kingdom
Modernist architects
People from Grozny
People educated at Harrow School
People educated at Downsend School
Illinois Institute of Technology faculty
Harvard Graduate School of Design faculty
Yale University faculty
Massachusetts Institute of Technology faculty
Emigrants from the Russian Empire to the United States
20th-century British architects
Brooklyn College faculty